Antonio Giarola or Gerola, known as Cavalier Coppa was an Italian painter of the Baroque period.

He was a pupil of Francesco Albani and Guido Reni in Bologna. He was active in Mantua, and then for many years in Verona.

References

1590s births
1665 deaths
17th-century Italian painters
Italian male painters
Italian Baroque painters
Painters from Bologna
Painters from Verona